Ben McKenna (1939 – 26 March 1992) was an Irish cyclist. He won the Rás Tailteann in 1959.

Early life
McKenna was born at Cottage Hill, Stamullen in 1939; his family later moved to Julianstown.

Career
McKenna was a founding member of St. Patrick's East Meath cycling club in 1955.

He first competed in the Rás Tailteann in 1956, and won the competition in 1959. He finished second in 1961 and 1964.

McKenna also won the Rás Laighean in 1958, the Mick Beggan Memorial in 1959 and the Tour of Ulster in 1960. He retired from cycling in 1977.

Personal and later life

McKenna was Chief Commissaire for the 1983 Rás. He also had a role in the reunification of the politically divided Irish cycling world, which culminated in the creation of Cycling Ireland in 1987.

McKenna married Grace Bosonnet and had six children; he died in 1992 aged just 52.

Legacy
The Ben McKenna Memorial is an annual cycling race held in Balbriggan.

McKenna was inducted into the Cycling Ireland Hall of Fame in 2017.

References

Irish male cyclists
Rás Tailteann winners
Sportspeople from County Meath
1939 births
1992 deaths